Coltman is an unincorporated community in Bonneville County, in the U.S. state of Idaho.

History
A post office called Coltman was established in 1896, and remained in operation until 1906.  The community has the name of Edward Coltman, a local postal worker. Coltman's population was 28 in 1909.

References

Unincorporated communities in Bonneville County, Idaho